Ruste is a surname. Notable people with the surname include:

Arne Ruste (born 1942), Norwegian poet, essayist, novelist, and magazine editor
Henry Ruste (1917–1993), Canadian politician
Ivar Ruste (1916–1985), Norwegian singer
Torbjørn Ruste (1929–2003), Norwegian ski jumper